Goran Švonja (born July 12, 1990) is a Serbian footballer who plays as a defender.

Playing career 
Švonja began his career in 2008 with FK Veternik in the Serbian League Vojvodina. In 2012, he was signed by FK Proleter Novi Sad in the Serbian First League. In 2016, he was loaned to the Serbian White Eagles of the Canadian Soccer League. In his debut season in Toronto he won the CSL Championship by defeating Hamilton City SC by a score of 2-1.

References 

1990 births
Living people
Serbian footballers
FK Veternik players
FK Proleter Novi Sad players
Serbian White Eagles FC players
Serbian First League players
Canadian Soccer League (1998–present) players
Association football defenders
Serbian League players